Ampelocissus elegans is a species in the genus Ampelocissus. It is a herbaceous climber with trifoliate leaves.

Uses
The trifoliate leaves of A. elegans are used in cooking and herbs. It used as a spice in cooking. The fruit of A. elegans can be used in Chinese herbs.

References

elegans
Plants described in 1911